Fr. Adam Studziński (2 June 1911 – 2 April 2008) was a Polish Roman Catholic priest (of the Dominican Order). Studzinski served as chaplain of the Polish Armed Forces in the West during World War II.

Biography
Studziński was first ordained as a Dominican priest in 1937. He served with the Polish forces in Palestine. He later took part in the Italian Campaign with Polish forces during the World War II, including the Battle of Monte Cassino. For his service as a Polish chaplain during the war, Fr. Studziński was honored with several Polish military and state honors, including the Cross of Valour (Poland), Silver Cross of the Virtuti Militari, Cross of Merit with Swords and the Commander's Cross with Star of Polonia Restituta (Order of Reborn Poland). He was also awarded with several British honors as well.

Adam Studziński studied art conservation at the Jan Matejko Academy of Fine Arts in Kraków. He worked to renovate the Dominican monastery and St. Guy's Catholic Church, both of which are located in Krakow.

Studziński was made an honorary citizen of Krakow in 1999. He was promoted to the rank of general in 2006. He authored several publications, including a guide to Polish war cemeteries in Italy and a book about his memories of World War II. He remained active in Polish veteran organizations, including for Polish Scouting, where he had ranked Harcmistrz.

Fr. Adam Studziński died in Krakow on April 2, 2008, at the age of 96.

References

External links

 o. Adam Studziński (1911-2008) - sylwetka
 o. Adam Studziński - Byłem kapelanem pod Monte Cassino
  o. Adam Studziński - pierwszy proboszcz na Służewie
   Zmarł o. Adam Studziński - dominikanie.pl
   o. Adam Studziński nie żyje - serwis eKAI
   o. Adam Studziński (2.06.1911-2.04.2008) - nekrolog Urzędu do Spraw Kombatantów i Osób Represjonowanych oraz fotografie z lutego 2008 r.

1911 births
2008 deaths
Polish generals
20th-century Polish Roman Catholic priests
Commanders with Star of the Order of Polonia Restituta
Recipients of the Silver Cross of the Virtuti Militari
Recipients of the Cross of Valour (Poland)
Recipients of the Cross of Merit with Swords (Poland)
Polish military chaplains
World War II chaplains
Conservator-restorers
Polish Dominicans